Radio-Activity  (German title: Radio-Aktivität) is the fifth studio album by German electronic music band Kraftwerk, released in October 1975. The band's first entirely electronic album is also a concept album organized around the themes of radioactive decay and radio communication. All releases of the album were bilingual, with lyrics in both English and German. The album was accompanied by single release of the title track, which was successful in France and Belgium.

Background
Following the success of its 1974 predecessor Autobahn, an album based on Germany's eponymous motorway network, Kraftwerk embarked on a tour of the United States with the "classic" lineup of the band formed by Ralf Hütter, Florian Schneider, Karl Bartos—who has joined February 1975—and Wolfgang Flür in April and May 1975.

Album title 
Radio-Activity'''s album title displays Kraftwerk's typical deadpan humour, being a pun on the twin themes of the songs, half being about radioactivity and the other half about activity on the radio. Bartos revealed that the title was inspired by a chart column in the American magazine, Billboard, which featured the most played singles under the title "Radio Activity". According to Wolfgang Flur, the concept arose as a result of the many radio interviews that Ralf and Florian had given on their American tour.

 Composition and recording 
His recording was in Kling Klang Studio, Düsseldorf, and it was self-produced by Hütter and Schneider. It was their first purely electronic album, and the first one to be performed by the "classic" band line-up. Karl and Wolfgang worked on electronic percussion. All the music was written by Hütter and Schneider, with Emil Schult collaborating on lyrics. For this album, the band had decided to record some vocals in English and Schult's command of the language after studying for a while in the United States was better than Hutter's or Schneider's. Tim Barr pointed out the impact his experiences had in the United States on his ability to speak the language and in more subtle ways as well. Emil also designed the artwork based in late-1930s 'Deutscher Kleinempfänger' radio.

The overture instrumental piece "Geiger Counter" used Geiger counter beats based on musique concrète. The album featured use of the distinctive Vako Orchestron keyboard to provide vocal choir on title track. "Antenna" used an echo chamber effect, and Hütter's Farfisa electronic piano was used on "Transistor". For the recording, an extensive use was made of the vocoder.

 Release and promotion 
In September 1975, the band toured the UK, playing 17 shows in England. By 1975, Hütter and Schneider's previous publishing deals with Capriccio Music and Star Musik Studio of Hamburg had expired. The compositions on Radio-Activity were published by their own newly set up Kling Klang Verlag music publishing company, giving them greater financial control over the use of songwriting output. Also, the album was the first to bear the fruit of Kling Klang as an established vanity label under the group's new licensing deal with EMI. Radio-Activity was released in October 1975. For their promotion, their record company sent them to a "real Atomkraftwerk" to take promotional photos. In these photos, the group was dressed in white protective suits and anti-radiation boots on their shoes. The album reached  on the Canadian charts in February 1976. The title track "Radioactivity" was released as a single in May 1976 and became a hit in France, selling 500,000 copies, and Belgium in the charts.

 Reception Radio-Activity was released to mixed reviews, with Rolling Stone criticizing the album: "...no cut on the album comes near the melodic/harmonic sense that pervaded Autobahn or the creative use of electronics on the much earlier album Ralf and Florian". Uncut wrote regarding their 2009 remaster that "begins like a heartbeat in the void, accelerating into the pulse that will form the spine of the title-song, an eerie tribute to the intangibles (music, disintegrating atoms) that linger in the atmosphere." It consider that "has a musty scent of Old Europe, which proved a hit with the synth groups of 1980-81 (eg, Ultravox and Visage), and it retains a blood-chilling, Wagnerian quality even now, thanks to Kraftwerk's use of the Vako Orchestron, a choir-like relative of the Mellotron." 

Chris Power from Drowned in Sound praised it for the experimental feeling in 2009: "A bridge between electronic experimentalism and the powerful, groundbreaking unification of avant-garde form and catchy, commercial function that was just around the corner, Radio-Activity'' is the sound of Kraftwerk finding their way in a strange new landscape that they were in the very process of creating". In a retrospective review, Jason Ankeny from AllMusic called the album "a pivotal record in the group's continuing development" and stated that it "marked Kraftwerk's return to more obtuse territory, extensively utilizing static, oscillators, and even Cage-like moments of silence".

Track listing

Personnel
Adapted from 2009 remaster liner notes.
 Ralf Hütter – vocals, synthesizers, Orchestron, electronic piano, drum machine, electronics
 Florian Schneider – vocals, vocoder, votrax, synthesizers, electronics
 Karl Bartos – electronic percussion
 Wolfgang Flür – electronic percussion

Additional personnel
 Peter Bollig – technical engineer (Kling Klang Studio, Düsseldorf)
 Walter Quintus – sound mix engineer (Rüssl Studio, Hamburg)
 Robert Franke – photography
 Emil Schult – artwork
 Johann Zambryski – artwork reconstruction (2009 Remaster)

Charts

Weekly charts

Certifications and sales

References

Bibliography

External links

Kraftwerk albums
1975 albums
Concept albums
EMI Records albums
Capitol Records albums
Kling Klang Studio albums
Experimental music albums by German artists
Experimental pop albums
German-language albums